Lefebvre is a municipality located in the Centre-du-Québec region of Quebec. The population as of the Canada 2016 Census was 904.

Geography

Communities
The municipality contains the communities of Lefebvre and Danby.

Demographics

Population
Population trend:

Language
Mother tongue language (2006)

See also
List of municipalities in Quebec

References

Municipalities in Quebec
Incorporated places in Centre-du-Québec